Gulou Dajie Station is a station on Line 2 and Line 8 of the Beijing Subway. The connection to line 8 opened on December 30, 2012.

Station Layout 
Both the line 2 and 8 stations have underground island platforms.

Exits 
There are 6 exits, lettered A1, A2, B, E, F, and G. Exit B is accessible.

Gallery

References

External links
 

Articles containing video clips
Railway stations in China opened in 1984
Beijing Subway stations in Xicheng District
Beijing Subway stations in Dongcheng District
Dongcheng District, Beijing
Xicheng District